Broad Sustainable Building Co., LTD (BSB) (Chinese:远大可建科技) is a construction company and a wholly owned subsidiary of Broad Group, specializing in developing prefabricated buildings. Several of its projects from BSB drew media attention after being erected in weeks, assembling up entire floors in a single day, while reducing costs. One of its projects, which is currently on hold, was to assemble the Sky City, a 220 floor building in Changsha in only 90 days. If completed, the building would become the tallest in the world. BSB intends to license its technology worldwide and currently has six franchises in China with plans to expand internationally.

Projects
BSB currently has several completed projects. Some of those were filmed in time-lapse photography and created much media attention.

Record breaking projects:
 In 2010, BSB constructed 15-storey Ark hotel,  in just 48 hours.
 In 2011, BSB completed T-30, a 30-storey hotel in just 15 daysat a cost of less than $1000/sqm low-cost.
 In 2011, BSB built a 6-storey dormitory in just 5 days.
 In 2012, BSB completed a 12-floor, 14,000 m2 building in Zhauyuan, Shandong, China. The building skeleton was constructed in 62 hours.
 In 2013, BSB built T25, a 25-storey tower in Yinchuan in 17 days.
 In 2014, BSB completed Z15 Weihai, a 17-storey skyscraper in 2 days.
 In 2015, BSB completed J57, a 57-storey mixed-use building in just 19 days.
 In 2021, BSB completed a 10-storey residential building in 28 hours and 45 minutes.

Sky City

Sky City was a project in Changsha, designed to build the tallest building in the world, 220 floors tall, using BSB technology in only 90 days. Some media publications put the time to completion at 210 days. The project was to be started in November 2012, but due to a delay in receiving government approval, that was put back to January 2013. In the end the start date was July 20, 2013, the Sky City skyscraper. As of February 2023 the site of Sky City Changsha is a fish pond.

Cost estimations put the cost of Sky City at $1500/sqm of floor area. There's even a plan for 2 km Skyscraper.

Franchising
BSB aims to grow by franchising. For a franchise serving 10 million people the franchise fee is $34 million and for a franchise serving 50 million people it is $50 million. Franchise fee must be paid up front.
In addition, franchises in developed countries will pay royalties of $50/sqm of built space while franchises in developing countries will pay only $20/sqm.

References

External links
 BSB homepage, 
 BSB projects, BSB projects
 BSB in Facebook

Construction and civil engineering companies of China
Sustainable building
Chinese companies established in 2009
Construction and civil engineering companies established in 2009